My Son's Story is the ninth novel by South African novelist Nadine Gordimer. It was written towards the end of the State of Emergency and first published in 1990. The very next year, Gordimer was awarded the Nobel Prize in Literature, and the Swedish Academy explicitly cited My Son's Story in their press release, calling it "ingenious and revealing and at the same time enthralling".

Plot 
My Son's Story tells the tale of a family torn apart by illicit love, political struggle and Apartheid. Sonny, an educated schoolteacher classed by South African law as Coloured, is slowly drawn into the struggle against the white regime. Unable to share this struggle with his family, he has an affair with the one person with whom he can talk, a white social worker. Unbeknownst to him, his family discovers the affair and are themselves drawn into the fight against Apartheid. Their lives were, in Gordimer's words, "determined by the struggle to be free, as desert dwellers' days are determined by the struggle against thirst and those of dwellers amid snow and ice by the struggle against numbing cold."

Narrative 
Half the novel is written in the first person, and tells the story through the eyes of Sonny's son, Will. It is Will's discovery of Sonny's adultery that opens the novel. Will's feelings are passionate and conflicted as love and hate for Sonny combine in the frontier where public politics mixes with private passion.

Reception 
"The heart and soul of this brilliantly suggestive and knowing novel," wrote Robert Coles in the New York Times, "is its courageous exploration of such matters, of the conceits and deceits that inform the lives not only of ordinary people but those whom the rest of us invest with such majesty and awe."

References

1990 novels
20th-century South African novels
Novels by Nadine Gordimer
Apartheid novels
Novels set in South Africa